Umbonium giganteum is a species of sea snail, a marine gastropod mollusk in the family Trochidae, the top snails.

Description
The height of the shell attains 16 mm, its diameter 27 mm. The large, solid shell has a depressed shape. It is slate-colored or reddish above, with a series of black spots below the suture, sometimes alternating with white ones.  The periphery is usually encircled with a row of white blotches. The base is largely white, with a dark streak encircling the callus. The low spire is conoidal and contains seven plane whorls. The body whorl is often somewhat concave above, rounded at the circumference, and slightly convex beneath. The shining surface is smooth, with a few (usually 4) narrow spiral impressed lines just above the periphery, which are obsolete in the adult. The convex base has a white callus or partly brown or ashen. In the middle there is a prominent, blunt, heavy tubercle. The oblique aperture is subquadrate.

This is largest species of Umbonium. The nearly smooth surface has a blotched periphery and a central tubercle on the callus pad distinguish it.

Distribution
This marine species occurs in the Western Pacific and off Japan.

References

External links
 

giganteum
Gastropods described in 1831
Marine gastropods